Chain Collector is a heavy metal band from Norway that formed in 2003. Some of the members originated from other bands such as Green Carnation, Carpathian Forest, Trail of Tears, Dismal Euphony and In the Woods. In 2004, the Forthcoming Addiction demo, containing four songs, was recorded at DUB studio. The band signed a two album record deal with Sound Riot Records in September 2004, but due to the touring of some members with their other bands at the beginning the year, the production of The Masquerade was not finished until March 2005. In July 2005 the German label Massacre Records became interested in the band, and Sound Riot Records licensed the Chain Collector album to them. Massacre Records released The Masquerade in Europe, Canada, and Australia in November 2005, while Sound Riot Records released their edition in December 2005. The band parted ways with Sound Riot and released the second album, Unrestrained in 2007.

Members

Current members
 Gøran Bomann - guitar
 Svenn Aksel Henriksen - vocals
 Anders Kobro - drums
 Martin Eltvik - bass

Former members
 Kjetil Nordhus - vocals
 Kjell Jacobsen - guitar
 Runar Hansen - guitar

Session members
 Hanne Kolstø - vocals
 Endre Kirkesola - bass, keyboards

Discography
 The Masquerade (2005)
 Unrestrained (2008)

References

External links
 Chain Collector's official website
 Chain Collector at Encyclopaedia Metallum

Norwegian melodic death metal musical groups
Norwegian progressive metal musical groups
Musical groups established in 2003
2003 establishments in Norway
Musical groups from Kristiansand